The TMS34010, developed by Texas Instruments and released in 1986, was the first programmable graphics processor integrated circuit. While specialized graphics hardware existed earlier, such as blitters, the TMS34010 chip is a microprocessor which includes graphics-oriented instructions, making it a combination of a CPU and what would later be called a GPU. It serves both purposes in a number of high-profile arcade games beginning with 1988's Narc and also Mortal Kombat and NBA Jam. Hard Drivin' (1989) from Atari Games contains two of the processors. The TMS34010 was used in professional-level video accelerator cards for IBM PC compatibles in the early 1990s.

The TMS34010 is a bit addressable, 32-bit processor, with two register files, each with fifteen registers and sharing a sixteenth stack pointer. The instruction set supports drawing into two-dimensional bitmaps, arbitrary variable-width data, conversion of pixel data to different bit depths, and arithmetic operations on pixels. Positions in bitmaps can be specified either as X, Y coordinates or as addresses. The TMS34010 is capable of executing any general-purpose program and is supported by an ANSI compliant C compiler. Most of the arcade games that use the processor were written in native assembly language, not C.

The design of the TMS34010 was led by Karl Guttag, who previously worked on the TMS9918 video chip. Development took place at TI facilities in Bedford (UK) and Houston (US). First silicon was working in Houston in December 1985, with shipment of development boards to IBM's workstation facility in Kingston, New York, in January 1986.

Texas Instruments follow-up processor, the TMS34020, can be used with a floating point coprocessor to render three-dimensional graphics.

Uses

Arcade video games
The TMS34010 was used in many coin-operated arcade video games from 1988–1997.

Atari Games
Hard Drivin' (1989)
S.T.U.N. Runner (1989)
Race Drivin' (1990)
Steel Talons (1991)

Williams / Midway
NARC (1988)
Smash TV (1990)
Trog (1990)
Strike Force (1991)
Super High Impact (1991)
Terminator 2: Judgment Day (1991)
Total Carnage (1992)
Mortal Kombat (1992)
Mortal Kombat II (1993)
NBA Jam (1993)
 Mortal Kombat 3 (1995)
 Ultimate Mortal Kombat 3 (1995)
WWF WrestleMania (1995)
 NHL: 2-on-2 Open Ice Challenge (1995)
 NBA Hangtime (1996)
 NBA Maximum Hangtime (1996)
 Rampage World Tour (1997)

MicroProse Games
F-15 Strike Eagle (1991)
B.O.T.S.S. - Battle of the Solar System (1992)

Other
AmeriDarts (1989)

Video accelerators
The TMS chips are compliant with the 1989 Texas Instruments Graphics Architecture (TIGA) standard, and in the early 1990s were used in professional-level video coprocessor boards for MS-DOS, Microsoft Windows, and SCO Unix. In a 1991 article on graphics adapters, PC Magazine reported that the fastest boards for regenerating AutoCAD test images were based on the TMS34010.

The Aura Scuzzygraph, Radius PowerView, and Radius SuperView external SCSI graphics cards for Apple Macintosh computers are based on the TMS34010.

Sun386i uses TMS34010 in the CG5 (Roadracer) videocard.

The Amiga A2410 graphics card uses the TMS34010 and was sold in Commodore Amiga UNIX workstations, the Amiga 2500UX and 3000UX.  It was developed in conjunction with the University of Lowell. When running Amiga UNIX, the card supports the X Window System and gives a high resolution 8-bit display. The card can also be used when running Amiga OS, with support libraries and some Retargetable Graphics implementations.

Game console
TI made an unsuccessful effort in 1987 and 1988 to convince games makers such as Nintendo and Sega to write 3D games and create a new console market. In 1987 TI provided the first demonstration of true real-time 3D games with stereo sound effects on a personal computer (PC), using a small TMS34010 adapter card (called "The Flippy"). The Flippy was designed as the basis of a game development system for consoles and as a PC gaming card in its own right.

TMS34020

The successor to the TMS34010, the TMS34020 (1988), provides several enhancements including an interface for a special graphics floating point coprocessor, the TMS34082 (1989). The primary function of the TMS34082 is to allow the TMS340 architecture to generate high quality three-dimensional (3D) graphics. The performance level of 60 million vertices per second was advanced at the time.

The TMS34020 was used in some arcade games, such as Revolution X (1994).

The Rambrandt Amiga extension card from Progressive Peripherals & Software supported up to four TMS34020, for use in virtual reality simulations.

References

 "TI's TMS34020 Graphics System Processor". (31 October 1990). Microprocessor Report.

External links
 TMS34010 promotional video

Computer-related introductions in 1986
TMS34010
Graphics chips
32-bit microprocessors